Elisa's is a Swedish dansband from the Skaraborg, Sweden established in 2009. The band is named after its lead singer Elisa Lindström. The band won the 2010 Dansbandskampen competition.

The band was launched by young artists in Musikgymnasiet i Skövde (the Music College in Skövde). During late 2010, the band's fame spread in Sweden. Their first single, "Hey Go So Long", was recorded in February 2010. In 2011 the band went to the top of the Swedish Albums Chart with their debut studio album Det här är bara början

Members
Elisa's is made up of:
Elisa Lindström – lead vocals, trumpet
Markus Frykén – guitar
Petter Ferneman – bass, accordion
Robert Lundh – piano
Daniel Wallin – drums

Discography

Albums

Singles

Svensktoppen songs
2011: "Det här är bara början"
2011: "En stjärna föll för oss"
2011: "Jag säger som det är"

References

External links

Official website

Dansbands
Musical groups established in 2009
2009 establishments in Sweden
Swedish-language singers